Bruce Jung Da Linghu (born January 1954) is a Taiwanese diplomat. He was the Deputy Minister of Foreign Affairs (MOFA) from 24 September 2015 until 20 May 2016.

Education
Linghu obtained his bachelor's degree in English from National Taiwan Normal University in 1975 and master's degree in American Studies from Tamkang University in 1979. He then pursued advanced studies at Oxford University in the United Kingdom from 1982 to 1983.

Political career
In 1982-1985, he worked under the Department of Protocol and Department of North American Affairs of MOFA and in 1985-1987, he became a special assistant to the Deputy Minister of MOFA. In 1987-1993, he was the senior assistant for the Taipei Economic and Cultural Office (TECO) in Los Angeles, United States. In 1993-1995, he became a senior assistant to the Vice Minister of MOFA. In 1995-1997, he was the Division Director of TECO in San Francisco. In 1997-2001, he became the Deputy Director-General of TECO in Los Angeles. In 2001-2004, he was the Deputy Director-General of Department of North American Affairs of the MOFA. In 2004-2007, he was the Director-General of TECO in Auckland, New Zealand.

References

1954 births
Government ministers of Taiwan
Living people
Alumni of the University of Oxford
National Taiwan Normal University alumni
Tamkang University alumni
Ambassadors of the Republic of China
Deputy mayors of Taichung
Representatives of Taiwan to Canada